C Madathil Ashok Sekhar, popularly known as CM Ashok Sekhar, was an Indian cricketer who played 35 first-class matches between 1967 and 1977 for Kerala. Sekhar played as a wicket keeper batsman and has captained Kerala team. Sekhar also served as Match referee.

References

External links
 

1946 births
2019 deaths
Kerala cricketers
Indian cricketers
South Zone cricketers
People from Dar es Salaam